Ema Shah (born 7 June 1981) is a Kuwaiti singer, composer, pianist, guitarist, actress, writer, dancer, and director. Her father is Kuwaiti, and her mother is Iranian. At the 2014 Winter Film Awards in New York City she won the award for Best Music Video, she won Best Short International Film at the 2016 North Hollywood Cinema Festival, she received five awards at the 2013 Best Shorts Competition in California, she won Finalist Best Short Film at the 2013 Back in the Box Competition, and she received six nominations at the Best Shorts Competition and one in the 2014 St Albans Film Festival in the UK for her music video "Masheenee Alcketiara". In 2012, she sang to the Kuwaiti Prime Minister Prince Nasser Mohammed Al-Ahmed Al-Sabah, a song of the Kuwaiti heritage sung by Abdel Halim Hafez.

Career

Early life

Shah studied opera, photography, and film. She has attracted attention through her activism, radical views, humanitarian and often controversial points of view, and eccentricity. In addition to being a founding member and president of the troupe Anthropology, she is a member of Team Force of the Rising Sun for brides in Kuwait, the Kuwait Cinema Club, the National Democratic Youth League, the Kuwait Democratic Forum, the Dubai Community Theater, the Kuwaiti Human Rights Association, and Club Business and Professional Women in Kuwait.

Theater
She made her debut stage appearance in Silence by Harold Pinter, followed by The Rhinoceros by Eugène Ionesco 2004, The old women and the poet by Yukiomicemia, Debate between night and day by Mohammed Affendi Al-Gazairi, the clown "Monodrama Bantomim" (at the Mediterranean People Festival-Italy), and The Meteor by Dorinmat.

In 2006, Ema established her group "Anthropology", joining actors from different nationalities, with performances, spectacles, and songs in different languages, including Arabic, English, French, Japanese, and Spanish. She has performed as a singer, pianist, composer, and actress at various local and international events.

Films
In 2011, she starred in a short movie called "Swing". She also acted on a short movie called Mooz (Banana). The film containing sexual allusions won the jury prize at the Dubai International Film Festival.

Music
She composed a collection of musicals inspired by books like "Jesus, the Son of Human", and The Prophet, written by Gibran Khalil Gibran, and performed them using piano and guitar at the Kuwait National Museum. She has also sung covers for many well-known and international artists. She took part in the musical We can not write on a black page. Her singles include "Shah", about her grandfather Shah Khan. She has sung lyrics written by, amongst others, Lebanese Elia Abu Madi, Saudi Malek Asfeer, and Australian Miranda Lee.

Controversy
Ema sparked a big controversy after singing "Hava Nagila" in Hebrew, which led to her being accused by some Islamic clerics of promoting Zionism and normalization of ties with Israel. International news agencies, and Arab and Israeli media, covered the story and the Los Angeles Times ran an article about the affair under the headline "Diva blasted by Islamic clerics for singing in Hebrew at club" including reports of putting her on trial. There were also threats on her life. Shah explained that she sang the song as she wanted to go beyond borders, and break barriers in support of universal peace between nations.

Dancing

Shah competed in dancing rumba at the Twin Cities Open 2019 in Minneapolis, reaching the finals. She danced different styles of silver–level rumba. They took second place in closed rumba, and third place in open rumb].

Below is the picture of a rare international duo: Gordan Bratt from Dancers Studio in St. Paul, Minnesota, dancing with Ema Shah, officially the first Arab dancer from Kuwait and the Arabian Gulf, in history, to Latin dance competitively.

The second competing: Ema was a 5x winner at the Embassy Ballroom Championship 28 September 2019 in Irvine, California, Dancing with Fred Astaire Studio professional: Forrest Walsh from Pasadena, California:

4X WINNER: Closed Gold Rumba
1st & 2nd Place: Open Silver Rumba
2nd Place: Open Gold Rumba
3rd Place: Open Gold Rumba

Filmography
MOOZ (Banana)- actress (2009)
Swing - actress (2011)
I wish we were Dancers - main actress (2011)
Choose to See - Director "Music Video"(2012)
Hey Mister - Director "Music Video"(2012) 
Masheenee Alcketiara - Producer, Director "Music Video"(2013)
Aleqini - Producer, Director "Music Video" (2014)
Who Killed $arah "Short Film" (2014)
Nashi and Mira - main actress "Future Film" (2015)
Bell - Producer, Director "Music Video" (2018)
The Visitor - main actress "Short Film" (2019)

Discography

 The Poem And the old woman, 2008.
 SYNC INFINITI, 2010.
 Emagination, 2018.
 In Love, 2019.

Awards

 The Youth Theater |Kuwait| 
2004 - Best Second Actress
 Best Shorts Competition |USA| Awards on IMDB
2013 - Award of Merit Best Music Video
2013 - Award of Merit Viewer Impact: Entertainment Value
2013 - Award of Merit Art Direction
2013 - Awards of Excellence Concept
2013 - Awards of Excellence Viewer Impact: Motivational/Inspirational
 Back in the Box Competition |USA|
2013 - Finalist Best Short Film
 Winter Film Awards |USA|
2014 - Best Music Video
 Horror Hotel: International Festival and Convention |USA|
2014 - 1st place music video
 Twickenham Alive Film Festival |England|
2015 - International Drama Award: Special Mention Award Awards Ceremony 2014 
 The Accolade Competition |USA|
2014 - Award of Excellence Music Videos
2014 - Award of Excellence Art Direction
2014 - Award of Merit Direction
2014 - Award of Merit Costume Design
 WORLD MUSIC & FILM FESTIVAL |USA|
2014 - Best Music Video
 The IndieFest Film Awards |USA|
2014 - Award of Merit Best Music Video
 Global Music Awards (GMA) |USA|
2015 - Bronze Medal Female Vocalist Awards on IMDB
2015 - Bronze Medal Lyrics/songwriter "Aleqini"
 The Northern Virginia International Film Festival |USA|
2015 - Best Music Video "Masheenee Alcketiara"
 Los Angeles Independent Film Festival Awards |Hollywood|
2015 - Best Music Video "Masheenee Alcketiara"
 St Albans Film Festival Nominations |England|
2014 - Best Music Video
 Be Film The Underground Film Festival Nominations |USA|
2014 - Best Music Video
 Meters Film Festival Nominations |Russia|
2015 - Best Music Video "Masheenee Alcketiara"
 American Sephardic federation Award |USA|
2016
 North Hollywood Cinema Festival |USA|
2016 - Best International Short Film "Masheenee Alcketiara"
 Mediterranean Film Festival |Italy|
2018 - Best Music Video/ International "Masheenee Alcketiara"
 Chambal International Film Festival |India|
2019 - Best Music Video/ International "Masheenee Alcketiara"
 Kapow International Film Festival |Hollywood, USA|
2019 - Best Music Videol "Masheenee Alcketiara"

References

External links

 |Industry Rules Magazine - New York City| Interview With Ema Shah: 'I Wish We Were Dancers: Ema Shah' |English|
 The Talk Magazine Interviewing Ema Shah |English|
 alqabas.com.kw article
  interviews with Ema on AL sabah Tv
 Khabab site:  Biography of Ema Shah
 Annahar site
  Los Angeles Times: KUWAIT: Diva blasted by Islamic clerics for singing in Hebrew at club
  interview with Ema Shah "alhurra TV – Very Close"
  interview with Ema mbc TV
  interview with Ema Shah Almarina FM Radio
  The event will feature world-famous composer, singer, actress and peace activist Ema Shah
 Winter Film Awards in New York - Best Music Video - Ema Shah
 Lola Bastinado interviews Ema Shah in New York
 Ema Shah on imdb
  icandy TV interviews Ema Shah at Winter Film Awards Film Festival in New York
 The Cinema Couch Interviews Ema Shah at Winter Film Awards Film Festival in New York
 faisal almutar Interview with Ema Shah
 alrai media celebrities "Kuwaiti Newspaper" Ema Shah Winner of Best Music Video at Winter Film Awards in New York
 alrai media celebrities "Kuwaiti Newspaper" Ema Shah won 13 International Awards for her Music Video Masheenee Alcketiara
 elfann Media - Ema Shah won 13 International Awards for her Music Video Masheenee Alcketiara 
 sashdesigns.com Exclusive : Who Killed Sarah? A very daring khaliji Movie Starring by Ema Shah
 indieflix.com indie-filmmakers Sma Shah Bio
 Ema Shah singing to the Prime minister of Kuwait Sheikh Nasser Mohammed Al-Ahmed Al-Sabah 
 alayam "Bahrain Newspaper" Ema Shah Winner of Best Music Video in New York
 prlog.org Ema Shah wins best music video at winter film awards independent film festival in nyc
 annahar Kuwaiti Newspaper celebrities Ema Singing in Spain 2014
 Ema Shah a guest on Kuwaiti Radio Station FM Regarding her at Clair-Obscur Filmfestival, Swaziland
 alanba "Kuwaiti Newspaper": the sponsors of the movie who killed $sarah are "Enjaz" with the "Imagination" Abu Dhabi. new Upcoming Movie of Ema and it will be showing soon in Dubai international Film Festival
 almshaheer "celebrities" Middle East. the Movie Who Killed $arah exposes the sexual abuse from family members
 al-seyassah "Kuwaiti Newspaper": the sponsors of the movie who killed $sarah are "Enjaz" with the "Imagination" Abu Dhabi. new Upcoming Movie of Ema and it will be showing soon in Dubai international Film Festival
 sabq "Saudi NewsPaper" spongers it Dubai international film festival and it Filmed in Kuwait. the producer is a saudi Arabian who brings up a subject about "sexual abuse from Family members   
 soqona "Dubai" a movie about "sexual abuse from family member" and the starring actress are Iranian and the producer are Saudi
 alrakoba "Sudan news" the Movie Who Killed $arah exposes the sexual abuse from family members
 nbaonline - Saudi Arabian producers a film about "sexual abuse from family members" and the starring actress from Iranian Roots
 Chicago International movies and Music Film Festival to book a ticket to Attend the music video "Masheenee Alcketiara"
 www.boxofficehero.com-event-ema-shah-masheenee-alcketiara-chicago-tickets
 EMA SHAH's interview FM Radio 99.7 "the breakfast Show" |English|
 albawaba.com/entertainment/kuwait-Kuwaiti crooner set to make records by singing in Hebrew!
 Ema Shah presenting a Member of the Kuwaiti Council nation's democratic Mohammed Al Juwaihel with 14 languages

1981 births
Living people
Kuwaiti women singers
Kuwaiti composers
Kuwaiti women writers
Kuwaiti people of Iranian descent
21st-century women singers
21st-century pianists
21st-century women pianists
English-language singers
Hebrew-language singers